Sarina Prabasi (born 1973/1974) is a Nepalese–American charity executive specialising in international development. She served as chief executive officer (CEO) of WaterAid America from May 2014 to September 2019. She was previously Deputy Chief of Programs at Orbis International, and had been a Country Representative at WaterAid Ethiopia.

Prabasi is also an author, her first book, The Coffee House Resistance Brewing Hope in Desperate Times, will be published April 9, 2019 by Green Writers Press. The book documents Prabasi's journey to become an American citizen and how the results of the 2016 election left the entire family feeling less certain about their place within their new home.

In addition to her charity work and writing, Prabasi co-founded Buunni Coffee with her husband in 2011. This is an independent company that sells its own roasted Ethiopian coffee; the coffee is organic and fair trade. They also a coffee shop called Café Buunni located in Upper Manhattan, New York.

Personal life
Prabasi was born in The Hague, Netherlands, and was brought up in Nepal. She moved to the United States to attend university. She studied at Smith College, and graduated with a Bachelor of Arts (BA) degree havingmajored in economics. She later attended the School of Oriental and African Studies, University of London, graduating with a Master of Science (MSc) degree in development studies.

Prabasi is married to Elias, an Ethiopian. Together they have two daughters.

Honours
In 2015, Prabasi was named one of the 'Most Innovative Women in Food and Drink' by Food & Wine. In 2016, she was named a 'Woman of Influence' by the New York Business Journal.

Published work 
Prabasi's first book,  The Coffee House Resistance Brewing Hope in Desperate Times, will be published April 9, 2019.

References

Living people
Nepalese expatriates in the United States
People in international development
20th-century Nepalese people
21st-century Nepalese people
People from The Hague
Nepalese businesspeople
Nonprofit chief executives
Smith College alumni
Alumni of SOAS University of London
1970s births
Nepalese non-fiction writers